Issa Modibo Sidibé (born 3 June 1992) is a Nigerien footballer who plays for Komárno and the Niger national football team.

Career

Jomo Cosmos
In July 2011, Sidibé signed a three-year contract with South African side Jomo Cosmos.

ASM Oran
In July 2014, Sidibé joined Algerian Ligue Professionnelle 1 side Oran.

Alay Osh
Prior to the 2016 Kyrgyzstan League season, Sidibé signed for 2015 league champions Alay Osh.

Kawkab Marrakech
In July 2017, Sidibé signed a two-year contract with Moroccan Botola side Kawkab Marrakech following a two-week trial.

Career statistics

International

Statistics accurate as of match played 5 September 2017

International goals

References

External links
 

1992 births
Living people
People from Agadez Region
Nigerien footballers
Association football forwards
Niger international footballers
2013 Africa Cup of Nations players
Nigerien expatriate footballers
Akokana FC players
Jomo Cosmos F.C. players
FC Dnepr Mogilev players
Belarusian Premier League players
ASM Oran players
Hafia FC players
FC Alay players
Kawkab Marrakech players
Botola players
MC Oujda players
FC Mulhouse players
MFK Zemplín Michalovce players
Slovak Super Liga players
KFC Komárno players
2. Liga (Slovakia) players
Expatriate footballers in Slovakia
Nigerien expatriate sportspeople in Slovakia
Expatriate soccer players in South Africa
Nigerien expatriate sportspeople in South Africa
Expatriate footballers in Belarus
Nigerien expatriate sportspeople in Belarus
Expatriate footballers in Algeria
Nigerien expatriate sportspeople in Algeria
Expatriate footballers in Guinea
Nigerien expatriate sportspeople in Guinea
Expatriate footballers in Kyrgyzstan
Nigerien expatriate sportspeople in Kyrgyzstan
Expatriate footballers in France
Nigerien expatriate sportspeople in France
Expatriate footballers in Morocco
Nigerien expatriate sportspeople in Morocco
Niger A' international footballers
2011 African Nations Championship players